John Wynne William Peyton, Baron Peyton of Yeovil,  (13 February 1919 – 22 November 2006) was a British  Conservative politician. He was Member of Parliament for Yeovil for over 31 years, from 1951 to 1983, and an early and leading member of the Conservative Monday Club. He served as Minister of Transport (later renamed Minister of Transport Industries in the Department of the Environment) from 1970 to 1974. He was a candidate for leader of the Conservative Party in 1975, losing to Margaret Thatcher.

Early years
Peyton was educated at Eton College. As a member of the Eton OTC, he was a member of the honour guard within the grounds of Windsor Castle at the state funeral of King George V in 1936.   He read law at Trinity College, Oxford, from 1937, but took a commission in the 15/19 Hussars in 1939 on the outbreak of World War II. He was sent to France as part of the British Expeditionary Force, but was captured in Belgium in May 1940, and spent 5 years in German prisoner of war camps, first in Laufen in Bavaria, then Warburg in Westphalia, then Eichstätt in Bavaria in mid 1942, and finally Moosburg in Bavaria from early 1945. He was liberated by American troops later in 1945. A brother was killed at St Nazaire in 1942.

Peyton studied law while confined, and became a barrister, being called to the bar in 1945. He accompanied Sir Walter Monckton, advisor to the Nizam of Hyderabad, to India in 1946 and 1947, in the run up to Indian independence. He became a broker at Lloyd's of London in 1947, and then pursued a political career.

Peyton was promoted to captain on 31 May 1949.

Marriages
He was married twice. He married Diana, daughter of Douglas Clinch, in 1947, but was divorced in early 1966. They had two sons, one of whom died young, and a daughter. He remarried on 27 July 1966, to Mary Cobbold, daughter of Colonel Humphrey Wyndham (also her second marriage).

Politics
Peyton unsuccessfully contested the safe Labour seat of Bristol Central for the Conservative Party in the 1950 general election. He was subsequently elected a Member of Parliament for Yeovil in the 1951 general election. He became Parliamentary Private Secretary to Nigel Birch, a junior defence minister, from 1952 to 1958. He supported the Suez War. He then served as Parliamentary Secretary to Richard Wood and Frederick Erroll, the Ministers of Power from 1962 to 1964. He remained opposition spokesman on power in opposition, until 1966.

He became Minister of Transport in the government of Edward Heath after the 1970 general election, one of six Monday Club MP members to achieve high office. His ministerial office was renamed Minister of Transport Industries when it was combined into the new Department of the Environment in October 1970. He remained in this position until the February 1974 general election. He was in office when the Mersey Docks and Harbour Board collapsed; he privatised British Rail's travel agency, Thomas Cook & Son, in 1972; and made helmets compulsory for motorcyclists.  He also delivered a Green Paper that proposed the Channel Tunnel.

He became Shadow Leader of the House of Commons in opposition. In 1975, he sought to become leader of the Conservative Party, standing in the second ballot after Margaret Thatcher defeated Edward Heath in the first ballot. He gained only eleven votes in the election, coming bottom of the poll, and Thatcher was elected by a convincing majority. He was shadow Minister for Agriculture in Thatcher's shadow cabinet, and was offered the position of Minister of Transport after the Conservative victory in the 1979 general election, but refused to return to his old office and became the only member of the shadow cabinet not to secure a ministerial position in the new government.

Peyton stood down from the House of Commons at the 1983 general election, and Yeovil was won by Paddy Ashdown for the Liberal Party. Peyton was created a life peer as Baron Peyton of Yeovil, of Yeovil in the County of Somerset on 5 October 1983.

He held right-wing views, but consistently opposed capital punishment, and he led a rebellion against the privatisation of the British rail industry under John Major in 1990. He also supported reform of the House of Lords to create a wholly directly elected second chamber.

Outside politics
Peyton was chairman of the British subsidiary of the Texas Instruments from 1974 to 1990. He also held positions with the London and Manchester Assurance Company, Trusthouse Forte, and British Aluminium, of which he was chairman from 1987 to 1991. He was treasurer of the Zoological Society of London from 1984 to 1991.

He published an autobiography, Without Benefit of Laundry in 1997, and a biography of Solly Zuckerman in 2001.

He was survived by his second wife, Mary, and his daughter and surviving son from his first marriage.

Arms

References
 Dod's Parliamentary Companion 1973, 160th edition, published by Sell's Publications Ltd., Epsom, Surrey.
Obituary, The Guardian, 27 November 2006
Obituary, The Independent, 27 November 2006
Obituary, The Daily Telegraph, 24 November 2006
Obituary, The Times, 24 November 2006

External links 
 
 Biography

Conservative Party (UK) MPs for English constituencies
UK MPs 1951–1955
UK MPs 1955–1959
UK MPs 1959–1964
UK MPs 1964–1966
UK MPs 1966–1970
UK MPs 1970–1974
UK MPs 1974
UK MPs 1974–1979
UK MPs 1979–1983
British Army personnel of World War II
World War II prisoners of war held by Germany
15th/19th The King's Royal Hussars officers
People educated at Eton College
Members of the Privy Council of the United Kingdom
Alumni of Trinity College, Oxford
Peyton of Yeovil
Fellows of the Zoological Society of London
Yeovil
1919 births
2006 deaths
British World War II prisoners of war
Secretaries of State for Transport (UK)
Ministers in the Macmillan and Douglas-Home governments, 1957–1964
20th-century English lawyers
English barristers
Life peers created by Elizabeth II